Gustavus Township is one of the twenty-four townships of Trumbull County, Ohio, United States.  The 2000 census found 948 people in the township.

Geography
Located in the northeastern part of the county, it borders the following townships:
Wayne Township, Ashtabula County - north
Williamsfield Township, Ashtabula County - northeast corner
Kinsman Township - east
Vernon Township - southeast corner
Johnston Township - south
Mecca Township - southwest corner
Greene Township - west
Colebrook Township, Ashtabula County - northwest corner

No municipalities are located in Gustavus Township.

Name and history
Gustavus Township was named after Gustavus Storrs, the son of a land agent. It is the only Gustavus Township statewide.

Government
The township is governed by a three-member board of trustees, who are elected in November of odd-numbered years to a four-year term beginning on the following January 1. Two are elected in the year after the presidential election and one is elected in the year before it. There is also an elected township fiscal officer, who serves a four-year term beginning on April 1 of the year after the election, which is held in November of the year before the presidential election. Vacancies in the fiscal officership or on the board of trustees are filled by the remaining trustees.

References

External links
Official Gustavus Township website
County website

Townships in Trumbull County, Ohio
Townships in Ohio